Gail Eskes (b 1955) in the US, is a professor of psychiatry at Dalhousie University. She became a Canadian Citizen and currently lives in Nova Scotia, Canada. She heads a 5-year, 2.6 billion dollar Brain Repair Center Project to develop and test a home “Cognitive Repair Kit” for people whose ability to pay attention has been affected by a stroke (DMRF, 2010).

Early life 
Eskes received her Bachelor of Arts in psychology at the University of California, Berkeley in 1975. She earned her graduate degree at the same university receiving a Doctor of Philosophy in 1981. After the birth of her two sons, she began her clinical training between 1993 and 2002 at Victoria General Hospital in Halifax, Nova Scotia.

At Berkeley, she focused on neural control of behavioral rhythms in animal models and was known during the 1980s for her work on male golden hamsters, attempting to explain their neural control of rhythms of daily sexual behavior. As well, she examined their circadian rhythms.

Interests 

One of Gail’s current projects is to understand how the brain works after a stroke. She studied how a stroke can affect fatigue levels and language abilities. Other areas of research include short-term memory, cognitive rehabilitation, and the role of the frontal lobes in different tasks.  She employed techniques such as behavioral testing and functional imaging.

Awards 

Gail received the Clinical Research Scholar Award from the Faculty of Medicine.

Outside the university 

She works with Heart and Stoke Foundation and the Canadian Stroke Network.

References

External links 

 Dalhousie Medical Research Foundation - Dr. Gail Eskes
 Gail Eskes, Ph.D. - Eskes Lab - Dalhousie University
 
 

1955 births
Living people